FF7 may refer to:

Final Fantasy VII, a 1997 video game
Final Fantasy VII Remake, a 2020 remake of the 1997 video game
Fast & Furious 7, a 2015 film